The Richard W. Leopold Prize is awarded biennially by the Organization of American Historians (OAH). Professor Richard W. Leopold (1912–2006) was President of the OAH in 1976–1977.

A three-member committee, chosen by the President of the OAH, chooses the best history book on U.S. federal government agencies, U.S. foreign policies, U.S. military affairs, or biographies of government officials. Only non-academic historians are eligible for the Prize, preferably historians employed by federal government agencies. The winning author receives $1,500. In 1990, the prize went to two books. In 2002, the prize went to two books, one of which had two authors. In these years, the authors split the prize money.

In the listing below, the author links lead to the latest available biographical data. Unfortunately, few government employees have sites comparable to those sites in academia.  The institutional affiliation listed is that at the time the awards was given, and the links are to those institutions. In both cases, “Wikipedia” sites, where available, were given preference.

Recipients

See also

 List of history awards

References

External link
OAH

American history awards
History books about the United States
History of science awards
Maritime history of the United States
Military history of the United States
Non-fiction books about military history of the United States
Political history of the United States
Biennial events
Awards established in 1984